The 2014 Huntingdonshire District Council election took place on 22 May 2014 to elect members of Huntingdonshire District Council in Cambridgeshire, England. One third of the council was up for election and the Conservative Party stayed in overall control of the council.

After the election, the composition of the council was:
Conservative 34
UK Independence Party 7
Liberal Democrats 5
Independent 4
Labour 1
Vacant 1

Background
At the last election in 2012 the Conservatives stayed in control of the council with 39 seats, compared to 7 Liberal Democrats, 3 UK Independence Party, 2 independents and 1 for Labour. However, in early 2013 Conservative councillors, Ken Churchill from Little Paxton ward and Bob Farrer from St Neots Eaton Ford, left the Conservatives to become independents and then joined the UK Independence Party in November 2013. Subsequently in January 2014 another Conservative councillor, Colin Hyams of Godmanchester ward, defected to the Liberal Democrats.

The changes meant that before the election the Conservatives had 35 councillors, Liberal Democrats 7, UK Independence Party 5, independents 3, Labour had 1 seat and 1 seat was vacant after the death of the Conservative councillor for Warboys and Bury, John Pethard. 17 of the 52 seats on the council were contested with 5 councillors, Terry Clough, Nick Guyatt, Colin Hyams, Terry Rogers and Alan Williams, standing down at the election.

Election result
The Conservatives stayed in control of the council after winning 11 of the 17 seats contested, but lost 1 seat to the UK Independence Party in Yaxley and Farcet. The UK Independence Party also gained a seat from the Liberal Democrats in Huntingdon East by 34 votes to end the election with 7 councillors. The only other change came in Buckden where independent Terry Hayward won a seat, which had formerly been held by Liberal Democrat William Clough before he stood down at the election. These defeats reduced the Liberal Democrats to 5 seats on the council, but Sarah Conboy did hold Godmanchester for the party after Colin Hyams, who had defected to the Liberal Democrats from the Conservatives earlier in 2014, stood down.

Ward results

By-elections between 2014 and 2015

Warboys and Bury
A by-election took place in Warboys and Bury on 7 August 2014 after the death of Conservative councillor John Pethard. The seat was held for the Conservatives by Angie Curtis with a majority of 59 votes over the UK Independence Party.

St Neots Priory Park
A by-election was held on in St Neots Priory Park on 27 November 2014 after the death of Conservative councillor Paula Longford. The seat was held for the Conservatives by Ian Gardener with a majority of 111 votes over the UK Independence Party.

References

2014 English local elections
2014
2010s in Cambridgeshire